He Goes Right, She Goes Left! is a 1928 German silent romance film directed by Fred Sauer and starring Livio Pavanelli, Lotte Neumann, and Georg Alexander.

The film's sets were designed by the art director Kurt Richter.

Cast

References

Bibliography
 Gerhard Lamprecht. Deutsche Stummfilme: 1927–1931.

External links

1928 films
Films of the Weimar Republic
Films directed by Fred Sauer
German silent feature films
German black-and-white films
1920s romance films
German romance films
1920s German films